The River Itchen flows through east Warwickshire in England.

Course

Shortly after beginning its course it runs under the Oxford Canal. The infant river is fed by several small brooks and skirts the village of Bishop's Itchington (to which it gives its name) before passing below the former Great Western Railway London to Birmingham railway (now operated by Chiltern Trains).

A mile-and-a-half north of Bishops Itchington, the River Itchen passes under Deppers Bridge which gives its name to the neighbouring hamlet. A mile further on it passes under the A425 main road west of the town of Southam. Immediately after the bridge, it flows through Stoneythorpe Park and passes the hamlet of Bascote. A mile north of Bascote, the Grand Union Canal crosses the Itchen valley on a half-mile-long embankment, and is carried over the river on an aqueduct.

The River Itchen reaches the large village of Long Itchington (again named from the river) and passes close to the church. West of the village, the river swings to the west briefly and its meandering course is bridged twice by the course of the disused  Leamington to Weedon railway line, now a footpath and cycleway.

History

In 2009 thousands of fish were killed in the River Itchen when poisonous chemicals washed off neighbouring farmland. Later in the year 3500 roach, dace and chub were released into the river to help to replenish stocks.

A section of the river is designated as a Site of Special Scientific Interest, as it "played a significant role in the development of the theory of underfit streams that related change in stream activity to postglacial climatic change and reduced discharges."

Water quality
The Environment Agency measure water quality of the river systems in England. Each is given an overall ecological status, which may be one of five levels: high, good, moderate, poor and bad. There are several components that are used to determine this, including biological status, which looks at the quantity and varieties of invertebrates, angiosperms and fish. Chemical status, which compares the concentrations of various chemicals against known safe concentrations, is rated good or fail.

Water quality of the River Itchen in 2019:

References

Ordnance Survey, 'Pathfinder' series 1:25000 map, sheet 977,  
Ordnance Survey, 'Landranger' series 1:50000 map, sheet 151
 Warwickshire Railways, Leamington-Weedon line page

External links

Rivers of Warwickshire
Sites of Special Scientific Interest in Warwickshire
2Itchen